Nicky Van Den Abbeele (born 21 February 1994) is a Belgian soccer midfielder who plays for Zulte Waregem of Belgian Women's Super League.

Club career
As a young player, Van Den Abbeele played for Cerkelladies Brugge and SV Jabbeke. In 2012, she joined Club Brugge KV, where she stayed until 2015. In the season 2015–2016 she moved to Lierse SK where she won the Cup of Belgium. In 2016, she signed for RSC Anderlecht. In 2017, she joined AFC Ajax. In 2018 she decided to stop playing, and to concentrate on a career outside the soccerfield.

International career
On 30 August 2010 Van Den Abbeele played her first match for Belgium U17. In the same match she scored her first international goal. On 2 June 2013 she played her first match for the senior team, a friendly match against Ukraine in Tubize. Van Den Abbeele was part of the squad who represented Belgium at the UEFA Women's Euro 2017.

References

External links
 
 
 
 
 Player Profile

1994 births
Living people
Belgian women's footballers
Belgium women's international footballers
Eredivisie (women) players
AFC Ajax (women) players
Women's association football midfielders
Super League Vrouwenvoetbal players
BeNe League players
Belgian expatriate sportspeople in the Netherlands
Belgian expatriate women's footballers
Club Brugge KV (women) players
Lierse SK (women) players
Expatriate women's footballers in the Netherlands
UEFA Women's Euro 2017 players